Lanquin Church or Iglésia de Lanquin is a Roman Catholic church in Lanquin, Guatemala. The church is noted for its fine imagery and silverware.

References

Roman Catholic churches in Guatemala